Saint John Neumann High School was an all-male Roman Catholic high school located in the South Philadelphia area of Philadelphia, Pennsylvania, United States. In 2004 the school, which was a part of the Roman Catholic Archdiocese of Philadelphia, merged with Saint Maria Goretti High School to form Saints John Neumann and Maria Goretti Catholic High School.

History
Southeast Catholic High School opened at the intersection of Seventh Street and Christian Street in 1934. The school became Bishop Neumann High School, after John Neumann, in 1955. In March of the following year the school moved to 2600 Moore Street, its last location. In August 1978 the school became St. John Neumann High School to reflect Neumann's canonization. In 1992 Neumann had 853 students. In October 1992 consultants told the archdiocese that Neumann and Goretti should be consolidated onto Neumann's site. By December of that year the archdiocese decided not to consolidate the two schools. In 2003 Neumann had 608 students. By then the combined populations of both schools declined by 29 percent in an 11-year span. In March 2003 the archdiocese asked the faculty and staff of Neumann to consider merging or closing the school as the school had increasing deficits and a decreasing student population. In June of that year the committees unanimously requested a merge. In September of that year Cardinal Anthony Bevilacqua, the Archbishop of Philadelphia, decided that the merge should occur. In 2004, Saints John Neumann and Maria Goretti Catholic High School opened.

The former Neumann campus became the St. John Neumann Place, a housing development for senior citizens.

References

External links
 Saint John Neumann High School (Archive)

Defunct boys' schools in the United States
Educational institutions established in 1934
Educational institutions disestablished in 2004
Defunct Catholic secondary schools in Pennsylvania
Defunct schools in Pennsylvania
1934 establishments in Pennsylvania
2004 disestablishments in Pennsylvania
South Philadelphia